The 1965–66 Montenegrin Republic League was 21st season of Montenegrin Republic League. Season started in August 1965 and finished in May 1966.

Season 

Except the teams from previous year, a new member of the competition were Dečić and Tekstilac. Dečić replaced a last placed team from previous season (Gorštak), while Tekstilac won the place emptied after the promotion of Lovćen to 1965-66 Second League.
At the end of 18 weeks long competition, Rudar with four points more than OFK Titograd. With that result, Rudar participated in the qualifiers for Yugoslav Second League.
After the autumn stage, Tekstilac withdrawn from competition due to technical difficulties.

Table

Qualifiers for Yugoslav Second League 
Rudar played in the qualifiers for 1966-67 Second League - East. Their opponent was a winner of Republic League of SR Macedonia - Rabotnički Skopje, who won both games.

Higher leagues 
On season 1965-66, three Montenegrin teams played in higher leagues of SFR Yugoslavia. All of them (Sutjeska, Budućnost and Lovćen) were participants of 1965–66 Yugoslav Second League.

See also 
 Montenegrin Republic League
Montenegrin Republic Cup (1947–2006)
Montenegrin clubs in Yugoslav football competitions (1946–2006)
Montenegrin Football Championship (1922–1940)

References 

Montenegrin Republic League